Badi,  stylized as Bʌ́di, was a monthly Japanese magazine for gay men. Established in November 1994 by Terra Publications, the first edition was released in January 1995.  The title comes from the Japanese pronunciation of "buddy".

The primary demographic of Badi was younger men (and admirers of younger men). The magazine featured articles on fashion, health, and relationships; community news and event listings; and stories and images in both photographic and gay manga formats. There was also a personal ad section, as well as advertisements from gay-related and gay-friendly businesses such as spas, clubs and hotels, bars, cafes and restaurants, host bars (hustler bars), brothels, and retail shops. Issues of Badi were approximately 500–1000 pages, including several pages of glossy colour. Though the magazine included pornographic pictures and stories, Badi was not mainly a pornographic magazine.

Badi announced in December 2018 that it would be folding, with the final issue to be published in March 2019.

References

External links
 Bʌ́di homepage 

Gay men's magazines published in Japan
Monthly magazines published in Japan
Pornographic magazines published in Japan
Magazines established in 1994
Sexuality in Japan
1994 establishments in Japan
Defunct magazines published in Japan
Magazines disestablished in 2019
2019 disestablishments in Japan